Green Springs was built in the late 18th century on lands in Louisa County, Virginia assembled by Sylvanus Morris. His son Richard (c.1740-1821) developed  near the mineral springs that gave the property its name and built the two-story frame house. The property stands in an unusually fertile region of central Virginia, surrounded by a number of 18th and 19th century farms and plantations. The district has been designated a National Historic Landmark district, comprising about  under scenic easement protection.

Description
The main house is a two-story frame structure with a compact plan. The house forgoes the typical Virginia central-hall plan, employing instead a simple four-room plan on the main floor, with the stairs relegated to a small space at the rear. The two front rooms each have their own entry in the five-bay main elevation. The rear has received a shed-roofed addition, and a two-story frame addition has been added on the west side of the house. The interior features its original woodwork, using simple shapes and patterns. The property includes a number of barns, slave quarters and other dependencies.

The Morris family
Colonel Richard Morris held a number of public offices, including Commissary for the Commonwealth, and was a member of the Virginia House of Delegates in 1788. Morris operated a small resort at the Green Springs with two houses, an icehouse, servant quarters, a blacksmith shop and utility buildings, which were abandoned by Richard's son and heir James Maury Morris.

Green Springs was listed on the National Register of Historic Places on June 30, 1972. It is a component of the Green Springs National Historic Landmark District.

References

External links
 Green Springs at the Green Springs National Historic Landmark District (NPS)
 Green Springs (Main House), Near Routes 617 & 15, Trevilians vicinity, Louisa, VA at the Historic American Buildings Survey (HABS)
 Green Springs, Barn No. 1, Routes 617 & 15 vicinity, Trevilians vicinity, Louisa, VA at HABS
 Green Springs, Barn No. 2, Routes 617 & 15 vicinity, Trevilians vicinity, Louisa, VA at HABS
 Green Springs, Corn Crib, Routes 617 & 15 vicinity, Trevilians vicinity, Louisa, VA at HABS
 Green Springs, Guest Cottage No. 1, Routes 617 & 15 vicinity, Trevilians vicinity, Louisa, VA at HABS
 Green Springs, Guest Cottage No. 2, Routes 617 & 15 vicinity, Trevilians vicinity, Louisa, VA at HABS
 Green Springs, Guest Cottage No. 3, Routes 617 & 15 vicinity, Trevilians vicinity, Louisa, VA at HABS
 Green Springs, Tenant Houses, Routes 617 & 15 vicinity, Trevilians vicinity, Louisa, VA at HABS

Houses on the National Register of Historic Places in Virginia
Houses in Louisa County, Virginia
Historic American Buildings Survey in Virginia
National Register of Historic Places in Louisa County, Virginia